Bernd Georg Lottermoser (born 1961 in Lüneburg) is university professor with expertise in the sustainable extraction of mineral resources.

Life and education
Bernd Lottermoser earned a Diploma of Science in geology from the University of Newcastle and a PhD in ore deposit geology from the same university. His doctoral thesis was titled Rare earth elements and ore formation processes.

Career 
Bernd Lottermoser has worked as an exploration geologist for BP Minerals and Kennecott, as research fellow for the Australian Institute of Nuclear Science and Engineering (AINSE, Sydney), Johannes Gutenberg-Universität Mainz and University of Melbourne, and as lecturer at the University of New England. He later served as professor of the School of Earth Sciences at James Cook University and the University of Tasmania and the Camborne School of Mines, University of Exeter. Since 2015 he holds the chair in sustainable resource extraction and is director of the Institute of Mineral Resources Engineering at RWTH Aachen University.

Awards 
1985: Scholarship (Union Oil Development Corporation)
1985: Bursary (Australasian Institute of Mining and Metallurgy)
1986-1989: Postgraduate Research Award (Australian Institute of Nuclear Science and Engineering)
1995: Michael Daley Award, for excellence in the reporting of science, technology and engineering issues, which are vital to Australia's future (Australian Federal Department of Industry, Science and Technology)
2000: Young Researcher Award (Alexander von Humboldt Foundation)
2009: Endeavour Executive Fellowship (Australian Federal Department of Education and Training)
2010: Erasmus Mundus Fellowship (European Union)
2012: Honorary professorship (University of Tasmania)

Published work
Bernd Lottermoser is author of over 250 publications, conference contributions and scientific reports. In addition, he has published 3 books:
 Mine Wastes: Characterisation, Treatment and Environmental Impacts. Springer Verlag
 Environmental Indicators in Metal Mining. Springer Verlag
 Rocks, Landscapes and Resources of the Wet Tropics. Geological Society of Australia

References

External links 
Bernd Lottermoser at ResearchGate

1961 births
Living people
Alumni of Newcastle University
Academic staff of RWTH Aachen University
21st-century German geologists
20th-century German geologists